Denis Simani (born 13 October 1991) is a footballer who plays for Luzern. Born in Switzerland, he elected to represent Albania at international level.

Club career
On 4 January 2022, Simani signed a contract with Luzern until 30 June 2024.

International career
Born in Switzerland, Simani is of Albanian descent. He was a called up to represent the Albania U21s in 2011.

References

External links
SFL Profile

Living people
1991 births
Albanian footballers
Sportspeople from St. Gallen (city)
Albania youth international footballers
Swiss men's footballers
Swiss people of Albanian descent
Association football defenders
FC Gossau players
Grasshopper Club Zürich players
SC Brühl players
FC Basel players
FC Rapperswil-Jona players
FC Vaduz players
FC Luzern players
Swiss Super League players
Swiss Challenge League players
Swiss Promotion League players
Swiss expatriate footballers
Albanian expatriate footballers
Expatriate footballers in Liechtenstein
Swiss expatriate sportspeople in Liechtenstein
Albanian expatriate sportspeople in Liechtenstein